Statistics of the 1966 Cameroonian Premier League season.

Overview
Diamant Yaoundé won the championship.

References
Cameroon - List of final tables (RSSSF)

1966 in Cameroonian football
Cam
Cam
Elite One seasons